The 1959 USC Trojans football team represented the University of Southern California (USC) in the 1959 NCAA University Division football season. In their third year under head coach Don Clark, the Trojans compiled an 8–2 record (3–1 against conference opponents), finished in a tie for the Athletic Association of Western Universities championship, and outscored their opponents by a combined total of 195 to 90. Total attendance for all 10 games was 453,865.

Ben Charles led the team in passing with 20 of 46 passes completed for 843 yards, four touchdowns and three interceptions. Jerry Traynham led the team in rushing with 123 carries for 583 yards and two touchdowns. Luther Hayes was the leading receiver with nine catches for 179 yards and two touchdowns. 
 
This was the first season for the five-team AAWU, following the dissolution of the Pacific Coast Conference in the spring. It comprised the four teams from state of California and Washington in Seattle. The other four teams from the north (Oregon, Oregon State, Washington State, and Idaho) were independent for several seasons.

Schedule

 Pittsburgh and Ohio State games were played on Friday night, Notre Dame on Thursday (Thanksgiving)

Players
 Al Bansavage, guard, 6'2", 220 pounds, Union City, California
 Mike Bundra, tackle, 6'2", 232 pounds, Catasaugua, Pennsylvania
 Ben Charles, quarterback
 Angelo Coia, halfback, 6'2", 195 pounds, Philadelphia
 Jim Conroy, fullback, 6'0", 197 pounds, Baldwin Park, California
 Dan Ficca, tackle, 6'1", 230 pounds, Atlas, Pennsylvania
 Garry Finneran, tackle, 6'2", 219 pounds, Cathedral
 Lynn Gaskill, halfback, 6'0", 175 pounds, Banning, California
 Luther Hayes, end, 6'4", 198 pounds, San Diego, California
 Clark Holden, fullback, 5'10", 195 pounds, Marshall, California
 Bob Levingston, halfback, 6'0", 185 pounds, Los Angeles
 Marv Marinovich, tackle, 6'3", 220 pounds, Watsonville, California
 Marlin McKeever, end, 6'1", 215 pounds, Mt. Carmel, California
 Mike McKeever, 6'1", 215 pounds, guard, Mt. Carmel, California
 Roger Mietz, guard, 5'10", 206 pounds, San Leandro, California
 Ron Mix, tackle, 6'3", 215, Hawthorne, California
 Dave Morgan, center, 6'4", 204 pounds, Natick, Massachusetts
 Al Prukop, quarterback, 6'1", 181 pounds, Mt. Carmel (led the team with 405 minutes played)
 Jerry Traynham, halfback, 5'10", 180 pounds, Woodland, California
 Jack Treier, center, 6'3", 208 pounds, Lancaster, Pennsylvania
 George Van Vliet, 6'2", 195 pounds, end, Whittier, California
 Glenn Wilder, 6'0", 181  pounds, end, Van Nuys, California
 Britt Williams, guard, 6'1", 210 pounds, Walnut Creek, California
 Willie Wood, quarterback, 5'9", 170 pounds, Washington, D.C.

Coaching staff
 Head coach: Don Clark
 Assistant coaches: Ray George, Al Davis, Mel Hein, Marv Goux, Jim Sears, John McKay
 Manager: Bob Lambeth

References

USC
USC Trojans football seasons
Pac-12 Conference football champion seasons
USC Trojans football